Retrieval is a 2006 Polish film directed by Sławomir Fabicki. It was Poland's submission to the 79th Academy Awards for the Academy Award for Best Foreign Language Film, but was not accepted as a nominee. It was also screened in the Un Certain Regard section at the 2006 Cannes Film Festival.

Cast
 Marek Bielecki - Badylarz
 Jacek Braciak - Gazda
 Michal Filipiak - Baton
 Olga Frycz - Teenager
 Katarzyna Lecznar - Badylarz's Daughter
 Eryk Lubos
 Andrzej Mastalerz - Elves Producer
 Dimitri Melnichuk - Andrij
 Jowita Miondlikowska - Gazda's Wife
 Antoni Pawlicki - Wojtek
 Dorota Pomykała - Mother
 Jan Pyrlik - Gazda's Son
 Grzegorz Stelmaszewski - Janek
 Karolina Tokarek - Gazda's Daughter
 Jerzy Trela - Grandpa
 Natalya Vdovina - Katia
 Danuta Widuch-Jagielska - Badylarz's Wife
 Wojciech Zielinski - Kalafior

See also
List of submissions to the 79th Academy Awards for Best Foreign Language Film

References

External links
Official website

2006 films
Polish drama films
2000s Polish-language films
2006 drama films
Films directed by Sławomir Fabicki